Richard E. Salomon is an American investment banker and philanthropist. He served as a member of the board of directors of the Council on Foreign Relations from 2003 to 2013 and again from 2014 to 2017.

Biography
He graduated with a BA from Yale University in 1964 and an MBA from Columbia University Graduate School of Business in 1967. From 1982 to 2000, he was a managing director to the investment firm Spears, Benzak, Salomon & Farrell. He was then the director of Mecox Ventures, another investment firm. He has advised the Rockefeller family.

He is a managing partner of East End Advisors, LLC, chairman of the advisory board of Blackstone Alternative Asset Management Group, and a director of Boston Properties.

He is a trustee of the Museum of Modern Art, the Alfred P. Sloan Foundation, and The New York Public Library. He is the vice-chairman of the board of trustees of Rockefeller University and a board member of the Peterson Institute for International Economics. In 1984, Salomon was elected to the Common Cause National Governing Board.

References

Yale University alumni
Columbia Business School alumni
Rockefeller University people
Living people
Peterson Institute for International Economics
Year of birth missing (living people)
American investment bankers
Philanthropists from New York (state)